Caju is a working-class district of the North Zone of Rio de Janeiro, Brazil. Prior to the current region Caju belonged to the historic district of São Cristóvão.

References

Neighbourhoods in Rio de Janeiro (city)
Working class in South America
Social class in Brazil